Banglar Badhu ( bride of Bengal) is a 1998 Bengali drama film directed by Anup Sengupta and music composed by Anupam Dutta.

Cast
 Abhishek Chatterjee
 Rozina
 Sabitri Chatterjee
 Subhendu Chatterjee
 Tapas Paul
 Biplab Chatterjee
 Gita Dey
 Anamika Saha
 Lokesh Ghosh

Music
"Jole Jole Nibhe Jabe" - Shakila Zafar
"O Rongila Bandhure" - Sabina Yasmin, Andrew Kishore, Music by-Ahmed Imtiaz Bulbul, Anupam Dutta

References

External links
 
 Banglar Badhu  at the Gomolo

1998 films
Bengali-language Indian films
1990s Bengali-language films
Films directed by Anup Sengupta
Films scored by Anupam Dutta